Kevin David Salazar Chiquiza (born February 9, 1996), is a Colombian footballer who currently plays for La Equidad.

Club career
Salazar started his career with local Bogotá side Academia Xeneize, before participating in 'The Chance', organised by the Nike Academy. He finished the competition as one of the 2013 winners.

He then joined Colombian side Fortaleza, where he was praised for his performances, most notably in a 2-0 win over Millonarios.

In June 2016, it was announced that Salazar had joined Santa Fe. He was again credited for excellent performances before suffering a fracture in the metatarsal of his right foot in a collision with Alianza Petrolera goalkeeper Ricardo Jerez Jr. in a Liga Águila match on 26 September 2016.

Career statistics

Club

Notes

References

1996 births
Living people
Footballers from Bogotá
Colombian footballers
Categoría Primera B players
Categoría Primera A players
Fortaleza C.E.I.F. footballers
Independiente Santa Fe footballers
Atlético Bucaramanga footballers
Águilas Doradas Rionegro players
La Equidad footballers
Association football midfielders
Nike Academy players